Anthony or Tony Gray may refer to:

People
Tony Gray (comics), artist and writer
Tony Gray (cricketer) (born 1963), West Indian cricketer
Tony Gray (rugby union coach) (born 1942), former Wales rugby union player and coach
 Tony Gray (19272014), a member of the comedy troupe The Alberts

Fictional characters 
Anthony Gray, a character in The Wire

See also
Anthony Grey (disambiguation)
Tony Grey (disambiguation)